John III, Lord of Polanen ( – 3 November 1378 in Breda) was Lord of Polanen, Lord of De Lek and Lord of Breda.

Life 
He was a son of John I, Lord of Polanen and Catherine of Brederode. Polanen Castle near Monster was the ancestral seat of the family. In 1327 John I had acquired Oud Haerlem Castle. In 1339, John II purchased the Lordship of Breda and built Breda Castle, together with his father.

John succeeded his father in 1342 and also took over his father's position as councilor of the Count of Holland and Zeeland. In the autumn of 1343, he accompanied Count William IV on a pilgrimage to the Holy Land. He also participated in a crusade against the Prussians. He was not present in the September 1345 campaign against the Frisians, which saw William IV killed during the disastrous Battle of Warns. On 17 November 1345, John II granted Polanen Castle in arrear fief to his younger brother Philip I of Polanen.

First phase of the Hook and Cod Wars 
William of Duivenvoorde and his nephew John II were leaders of what would become known as the 'Hook' party during the Hook and Cod wars. In 1350, they travelled to Hainaut to pay homage to Countess Margaret II. Somewhere between 1347 and 1350, John was appointed Burgrave of Geertruidenberg. In 1350, he purchased the Land of Breda for  florins from John III, Duke of Brabant. He also acquired high justice over Breda.

The Hook and Cod wars started in earnest in about March 1351. Polanen Castle was besieged for 2 weeks and then demolished. Oud Haerlem Castle was taken after a siege which lasted more than 6 months, even though John van not present. The Siege of Geertuidenberg Castle lasted from October 1351 to August 1352. Here John's brother Philip commanded as his lieutenant. As a result of the war John lost the Lordship of De Lek.

During the regency of Albert of Bavaria 
In 1358, Albert of Bavaria became regent of Holland for his brother. This was good for the members of the old Hook faction. In 1358 John was somewhat compensated for his losses with other fiefs and possessions.

In Brabant 
Whatever the later events in Holland, John seems to have concentrated his efforts on extending his holdings in the Breda area. It made him more of a Brabant than a Holland lord.

John II was captured during the 1371 Battle of Baesweiler. He was released several months later, after his relatives had paid a ransom. In 1375, he was appointed stadtholder of the Great Holme.

John II died in 1378 and was buried in the Church of Our Lady in Breda.

Marriages and issue 
John II of Polanen married three times.

In 1340, he married Oda of Horne-Altena (1318-1353), daughter of Willem IV of Horne. They had three children:
 John III, his heir
 Beatrice ( – 1394); married Henry VIII, the son of Henry VII, Lord of Bautershem, who was also Lord of Bergen op Zoom as Henry I, and his wife, Maria Merxheim, Lady of Wuustwezel and Brecht
 Oda ( – 15th century), married Henry III, Burgrave of Montfoort

In 1353, he married Matilda ( – 1366), an illegitimate daughter of John III, Duke of Brabant.  They had two sons:
 Dirck of the Leck (d. 1416), married Gilisje of Cralingen.  He was outlawed for a while, because he was suspected of having participated in the murder of Aleid van Poelgeest
 Henry of the Leck (d. 1427), married Jeanne of Ghistelles, and was a councillor of Countess Jacqueline of Holland

In 1370, he married Margaret, a daughter of Otto, Lord of Lippe and Irmgard of the Marck.  They had one son:
 Otto (d. before 20 October 1428), married before 1396 to Sophia, a daughter of Count Frederick III of Bergh-'s-Heerenberg and Catherine of Buren

References 
 H.M. Brokken: Het ontstaan van de Hoekse en Kabeljauwse twisten, p. 414 and footnote 139 on page 227
 Vereeniging tot Uitgaaf der Bronnen van het Oud-Vaderlandsche Recht: Werken, issue 17, Kemink, 1956

External links 
 Entry at genealogieonline.nl

|-

14th-century births
Year of birth unknown
1378 deaths
House of Polanen
Lords of Breda
14th-century people of the Holy Roman Empire